Cow, also titled Only Stwpd Cowz Txt N Drive, is a 30-minute public information film directed by Peter Watkins-Hughes with assistance from Gwent Police and Tredegar Comprehensive School in Wales. The August 2009 film was a co-production by Gwent Police and Tred Films, with special effects by Zipline Creative Limited. The film features original music by Stuart Fox, a composer and sound designer from Gloucester, England. A previous film, "Lucky Luke," was intended to warn about the dangers of joyriding; "Cow" was intended to be a sequel of sorts. The film was shown to students in the UK and was released on YouTube.

The film, using local drama students as actors, tells the story of 17-year-old Cassie "Cow" Cowan (Jenny Davies), who texts and drives and gets into a car accident; her friends Emm and Jules (Amy Ingram and Laura Quantick) are in the vehicle with her. Four people die as a result of Cassie's actions. The police intended for the film to be aired in British schools.

The film cost 'a few thousand pounds' to make. 300 drama students auditioned for the film.

The full film is shown to students in the United Kingdom. As of 2009 the film had not been aired on television stations in the United States. In 2010, a modified 30-second version of the public service announcement was to begin airing during certain hours on 13 television stations in central and upstate South Carolina.

Story
Cassie "Cow" Cowan, Emma "Emm" Williams, and Jules O'Shea, three teenage friends who work at the same hardware shop, agree to leave work early in order to cheer up Jules, who threw up on duty after discovering that she was pregnant. On the way home, Cassie texts while driving and her car drifts across the road and collides head-on with an inattentive driver on the outskirts of Tredegar, Gwent. Subsequently, a third driver crashes into them. Emma and Jules are killed in the accident, along with a couple in the second vehicle involved in the crash, while the couple's young son sustains several injuries but survives. It is not clear what the outcome is for the third driver or a young baby of the second driver.

The rest of the film depicts the accident's aftermath and consequences. The police break the news to bereaved relatives, and Cassie herself almost dies in hospital, but is revived. At the hospital, Cassie's father meets the grandmother of the couple's son. When a local paper reports that she was breathalyzed shortly before the accident, her parents are ostracised by the local community (she was stopped by the police for speeding, but passed the test). Jules' boyfriend Morgan appears on television to express his grief about the death of their unborn baby, although he had previously dumped her because of the pregnancy. Eventually, despite her mother's reassurances, Cassie is sentenced to seven years imprisonment for causing death by dangerous driving.

Reception
The clip of the public service announcement received worldwide attention, and the clip received over one million views on YouTube by 25 August 2009 and reuploaded on 28 May 2016. The video received attention due to the graphic content. The film earned honours in the Advertising Age's weekly Creativity Top 5 video. and became an overnight worldwide internet hit after being shown on the US The Today Show television show.

Donny Deutsch, advertising executive and American TV host, said "I will show this to every kid I know, and I salute the police department" and "I would really implore various local stations: Run this stuff, put this on the air. It will help." Mick Giannasi, the then chief constable of Gwent Police, said "The messages contained in the film are as relevant to the people of Tennessee as they are to the residents of Tredegar." He also said "Texting and driving can have tragic consequences, and the more this film is viewed, the better."

Cast
 Jenny Davies – Cassie "Cow" Cowan
 Amy Ingram – Emma "Emm" Williams
 Laura Quantick – Jules O'Shea
 Roger Evans – Michael Cowan
 Adrienne O'Sullivan – Laura Cowan
 Phylip Harries – Mr. Williams
 Jason May – Mr. O'Shea
 Gareth Price Stevens – Morgan Davis
 Margaret John – Joyce Richards

References

External links

 
 "Graphic Texting & Driving PSA." – CBS News (WARNING: GRAPHIC CONTENT)
 "Shocking Video Warning To Teen Drivers." – WXII

British short films
Gwent (county)
Public service announcements
2008 short films
2008 films
Automotive safety